Jeremiah Warren "Jerry" Gwin (February 25, 1880 – ?) was an American college football coach. He served as the head football coach at Mississippi A&M (now known as Mississippi State University) for the 1902 season. During his one-season tenure, Gwinn compiled an overall record of one win, four losses and one tie (1–4–1).

Head coaching record

References

1880 births
Year of death missing
American football centers
Auburn Tigers football players
Mississippi State Bulldogs football coaches
People from Jefferson County, Alabama